Eric Birch High School is located at 7930 Locust Avenue in Fontana, California. It has been open since September 1994. The current principal is Mike Bunten.

References

External links
 Official website

Education in Fontana, California
High schools in San Bernardino County, California
Public high schools in California
1994 establishments in California